Angustmycin A is a purine antibiotic and metabolite from Streptomyces bacteria with the molecular formula C11H13N5O4. Angustmycin A is also a cytokinin.

References

Further reading 

 
 

cytokinins
Antibiotics
Purines